Madhu Road railway station ( Maṭu ṟōṭ toṭaruntu nilaiyam) is a railway station in the town of Madhu in northern Sri Lanka. The station serves pilgrims visiting the Shrine of Our Lady of Madhu. Owned by Sri Lanka Railways, the state-owned railway operator, the station is part of the Mannar Line which links Mannar Island with the capital Colombo. The station was not functioning between 1990 and 2013 due to the civil war. The Mannar Line between Medawachchiya and Madhu Road was re-opened on 14 May 2013.

References

Railway stations in Mannar District
Railway stations on the Mannar Line